Men of the World was a 1990s BBC1 situation comedy which starred David Threlfall and John Simm.

Production details
Written by Daniel Peacock – who also appeared as the character Gilby Watson. – Men of the World was directed by Terry Kinane and produced for Alomo Productions by Laurence Marks, Maurice Gran and Claire Hinson. Marks and Gran are successful sitcom writers in their own right.

Neither series has ever been repeated on UK terrestrial television, though was shown on Carlton Select sometime in the late nineties. However, it has not had a DVD release and appears to have largely been forgotten.

Plot
Lenny Smart and Kendle Bains are flatmates and work together as travel agents in Manchester. Thirtysomething Lenny attempts, with the help of old friend Gilby, to turn sensitive 23-year-old Kendle into a "real man". In one episode, Kendle receives a telescope for a birthday present and subsequently ends up looking into all the windows opposite, Gilby, Becky and her friends end up fighting over what to look at.

Main cast
David Threlfall ... as Lenny Smart
John Simm ... as Kendle Bains
Daniel Peacock ... as Gilby Watson
Eva Pope ... as Becky (Series 2)
Brenda Bruce ... as Mrs Daff

Episodes

Series 1
"Match of the Day" (14 March 1994)
"The Assessment" (21 March 1994)
"Lost in France" (28 March 1994)
"The Big Fight" (11 April 1994)
"Team Table" (18 April 1994)
"The Runaway" (25 April 1994)

Series 2
"The Dice of Life" (26 July 1995)
"The Girl I Love" (2 August 1995)
"The Walking Wounded" (9 August 1995)
"Happy Birthday Kendle" (16 August 1995)
"Stolen Kiss" (23 August 1995)
"Farewell My Lovely" (30 August 1995)

References

External links

1994 British television series debuts
1995 British television series endings
1990s British sitcoms
BBC television sitcoms
Television series by Fremantle (company)
Television shows set in Manchester
English-language television shows